Boggs Valley is a glaciated valley, heavily strewn with morainal debris, which indents the east side of the Helliwell Hills between Mount Van der Hoeven and Mount Alford, Victoria Land, Antarctica. The geographical feature was first mapped by the United States Geological Survey from surveys and from U.S. Navy air photos, 1960–1963, and named by the Advisory Committee on Antarctic Names for William J. Boggs, United States Antarctic Research Program biologist who performed his biological observations while situated at McMurdo Station, Hut Point Peninsula, Ross Island, during the summer of 1967–1968. The valley lies situated on the Pennell Coast, a portion of Antarctica lying between Cape Williams and Cape Adare.

References
 

Valleys of Victoria Land
Pennell Coast